Mohammad Bahril Fajar Fahreza (born 16 February 2001) is an Indonesian professional footballer who plays as a left-back for Liga 1 club PSIS Semarang.

Club career

PSIS Semarang
He was signed for PSIS Semarang to play in Liga 1 in the 2021 season. Bahril made his professional debut on 15 October 2021 in a match against Persik Kediri at the Manahan Stadium, Surakarta.

International career
In August 2020, Bahril was included on Indonesia national under-19 football team 30-man list for Training Center in Croatia. He earned his first under-19 cap on 11 September 2020 in 3–3 draw against Saudi Arabia U19.

Career statistics

Club

References

External links
 Bahril Fahreza at Soccerway

2001 births
Living people
Indonesian footballers
Liga 1 (Indonesia) players
PSIS Semarang players
Association football forwards
People from Sampang Regency
Sportspeople from East Java